Trilogy Dominicana, doing business as Viva, is a mobile network operator in the Dominican Republic.

History 

Founded in 1883 as All America Cables & Radio Dominican Republic (an ITT subsidiary), the company was the country's first telecom to offer telegraph services to the Antilles.

In January 2000, Centennial Communications purchased 70% of the company, forming Centennial Dominicana. The company later launched a CDMA2000 network and provided Internet services over EVDO.

On November 24, 2006 Centennial Communications announced that they were selling 100% of Centennial Dominicana to Trilogy International Partners for US$80M. In April 2008, Centennial announced a rename to Viva and launched their GSM/GPRS/EDGE network. At the end of 2015 the Telemicro group owned by the business man Juan Ramon Gomez Diaz acquired the operations of Trilogy Dominicana. In August 2017 Viva launched a new 4x4 MIMO 4G LTE network.

Plans 
Viva has focused on prepaid and hybrid plans. Postpaid plans are commonly not featured in mainstream media.

Notes

External links

Telecommunications companies of the Dominican Republic
Mobile phone companies of the Caribbean